Pandoflabella nigriplaga is a species of snout moth in the genus Pandoflabella. It was described by Paul Dognin in 1910, and is known from French Guiana.

References

Moths described in 1910
Epipaschiinae